Timo Kaapo Arthur Murama (née Moberg; 15 October 1913 – 17 January 1981) was a Finnish nordic combined skier who competed in the 1930s. He was born and died in Rovaniemi.

He finished tied for seventh in the Nordic combined event at the 1936 Winter Olympics in Garmisch-Partenkirchen.

References

External links
Nordic combined Olympic results 1924-36.

1913 births
1981 deaths
Olympic Nordic combined skiers of Finland
Olympic ski jumpers of Finland
Nordic combined skiers at the 1936 Winter Olympics
Ski jumpers at the 1936 Winter Olympics
Finnish male Nordic combined skiers
Finnish male ski jumpers
People from Rovaniemi
Sportspeople from Lapland (Finland)
20th-century Finnish people